Purge, in comics, may refer to:

 Dark Horse Comics titles:
 Purge (comic book), a Star Wars comic book
 Purge, a one-shot based on Aliens
 Marvel Comics characters:
 Purge, a Marvel UK character and member of the Bacillicons from the series Digitek
 Purge, a character from X-Treme X-Men
 DC Comics characters:
 Purge, a robot fought that fought Superman and was built by Intergang
 Purge, a character who appeared in the series Gunfire

References

See also
 Purge (disambiguation)